The 1969 WANFL season was the 85th season of the Western Australian National Football League. It saw continued dominance by the three Perth clubs and Subiaco, who occupied the top half of the ladder constantly from the fourth round onwards, and finished four games clear of the other four clubs, who were all in a “rebuilding” mode with varying success – late in the season both Swan Districts and Claremont fielded some of the youngest teams in the competition's history, whilst the Tigers, who fielded thirteen first-year players including Graham Moss, Russell Reynolds and Bruce Duperouzel, began disastrously but four wins in five games paved the way to impressive record from 1970 to 1972. Among the top four, Perth failed to achieve a fourth consecutive premiership that at one point looked very much in their grasp due to the overwork of Barry Cable which robbed him of some brilliance, early-season injuries to key players Iseger and Page and a couple of surprising losses to lower clubs, whilst East Perth, who won consistently without being impressive for most of the season, failed for the fourth time in as many seasons in the Grand Final, this time to West Perth and in a much more decisive manner than any of their Perth defeats.

The league's popularity, aided by the driest football season in Perth since 1940, and a new $500,000 grandstand at Subiaco Oval, reached a high not to be surpassed. East Perth attracted an average of over twelve thousand spectators to each home match, including an all-time record WANFL home-and-away attendance against West Perth on the Saturday before Foundation Day.

Home-and-away season

Round 1 (Easter weekend)

Round 2

Round 3

Round 4

Round 5

Round 6

Round 7

Round 8

Round 9 (Foundation Day)

Round 10

Round 11

Round 12

Round 13

Round 14

Round 15

Round 16

Round 17

Round 18

Round 19

Round 20

Round 21

Ladder

Finals

First semi-final

Second semi-final

Preliminary final

Grand Final

Notes
Four consecutive premiership in the WA(N)FL was last achieved by East Fremantle between 1928 and 1931, and the sole previous occurrences were by Old Easts between 1908 and 1911 and East Perth (five consecutive) between 1919 and 1923. No WANFL/WAFL/Westar Rules club since 1970 has achieved four consecutive premierships.Austin Robertson junior was held goalless on only five occasions in his 269 games in the WANFL and VFL (in 1966 with South Melbourne), which occurred in 1962, 1963, 1965 and twice during his final 1974 season. He had not been held to one goal since his goalless Round 15, 1965 game with South Fremantle.Subiaco did play in the 1943 second-semi when league football was restricted to players under nineteen years of age as of 1 October.

References

External links
Official WAFL website
Western Australian National Football League (WANFL), 1969

West Australian Football League seasons
WANFL